Kambo Station is located at the village of Kambo in Moss, Norway on the Østfold Line. The station is served by commuter trains L21 between Stabekk via Oslo to Moss with half hour or hourly headway by Vy.

History
The station was opened in 1996 when the line between Ski and Moss was rebuilt to double track. There was also a Kambo station on the old track.

References

External links

Railway stations in Østfold
Railway stations on the Østfold Line
Railway stations opened in 1996
1996 establishments in Norway
Moss, Norway